Sphingomonas pituitosa  is a Gram-negative, non-spore-forming, rod-shaped and motile bacteria from the genus of Sphingomonas which has been isolated from water from a eutrophic artificial spring in Austria. Sphingomonas pituitosa produces exopolysaccharide.

References

Further reading

External links
Type strain of Sphingomonas pituitosa at BacDive -  the Bacterial Diversity Metadatabase

phyllosphaerae
Bacteria described in 2001